Johannes "Hans" Max Clemens (February 9, 1902 – 1976) was a German functionary of respectively the SS, Sicherheitsdienst (SD, Security Service) was primarily the intelligence service of the SS and the Nazi Party in Nazi Germany. Clemens was also known as the Tiger of Como while serving as a captain in the SS. During the war, he participated in the Ardeatine massacre, but was acquitted of involvement by an Italian military court. He was released and returned to West Germany in 1949.

Then he joined the Gehlen Organization and with Heinz Felfe, began feeding information to the Soviets. Before this work was discovered, he worked with the successor of the Gehlen Org, the Bundesnachrichtendienst (Bundesnachrichtendienst (Federal Intelligence Service, BND), the foreign intelligence agency of the modern German government, under the control of the Chancellor's Office).

Clemens was part of a group of Soviet spies that were put on trial in 1963. His co-defendants were Heinz Felfe and Erwin Tiebel. Clemens and Felfe admitted to having transmitted great amounts of secret information to the Soviets, including 15,000 classified documents. All three were convicted, with Clemens receiving a 10-years sentence for espionage. He was released from prison on health grounds in 1968.

Notes

1902 births
1976 deaths
SS-Hauptsturmführer
German mass murderers
German people convicted of spying for the Soviet Union
Double agents
Military personnel from Dresden
People of the Federal Intelligence Service
1963 in politics
People from the Kingdom of Saxony
Prisoners and detainees of Italy
Reich Security Main Office personnel
Nazi war criminals